The following is a list of programs currently or formerly distributed to PBS stations through American Public Television.

Current programming

Reality programs

Entertainment programs

Children's programs

Former programming

News programs

Entertainment programs

Children's programs

Children's specials

See also
 List of programs broadcast by PBS
 List of programs broadcast by PBS Kids
 List of programs broadcast by PBS Kids (block)

References

External links
 APTOnline.org: Search programs A-Z

American Public Television